P. cinnabarina may refer to:

 Passiflora cinnabarina, an Old World plant
 Pulvinula cinnabarina, an apothecial fungus